Adalar is a village in the Ağlı District of Kastamonu Province in Turkey. Its population is 67 (2021).

References

Villages in Ağlı District